Trenck's Pandurs (Hungarian: Pandúr) were a light infantry unit of the Habsburg monarchy, raised by Baron Franz von der Trenck under a charter issued by Maria Theresa of Austria in 1741. The unit was largely composed of volunteers from the Kingdom of Slavonia and Slavonian Military Frontier, and named after security guards otherwise employed to maintain public order. The Pandurs were presented to the empress in May 1741—with the unit's military band—earning them a claim of pioneering martial music in Europe. The Pandurs did not use uniforms and had an overall oriental/Ottoman appearance. The original organization of the unit was retained until 1745, when it transformed into a regiment. Trenck was relieved of command in 1746 and imprisoned in Spielberg Castle, where he died in 1749. The unit ultimately transformed into the 53rd Infantry Regiment, headquartered in Zagreb, until it was disbanded in 1919. The regiment's commemorative medals bear Trenck's image wearing Pandur attire.

The Pandurs took part in the War of the Austrian Succession, including the First and Second Silesian War. They contributed to the capture or destruction of Zobten am Berge, Strehlen, Klaus Castle, Linz, Deggendorf, Diessenstein Castle, Cham, Cosel fortress and Munich. During the Battle of Soor, the unit looted a Prussian war chest and the belongings of Frederick the Great.  The Pandurs earned a reputation as brave, audacious, feared and ruthless soldiers, known for looting and pillaging. They were prone to disobedience, breaches of military discipline and stubbornness. The city of Waldmünchen, located near Cham, celebrates the Pandurs and Trenck as the city's saviors for sparing the city from destruction in 1742. The Pandurs' and Trenck's heritage is also preserved in the city of Požega, Croatia, where an eponymous living history troop and city music band exist.

Etymology
The term pandur made its way into military use via the Hungarian language—being used in Hungarian as a loanword, in turn originating from the Croatian term pudar, though the nasal in place of the "u" suggests a borrowing before Croatian innovated its own reflex for Proto-Slavic /ɔ̃/. "Pudar" is still applied to security guards protecting crops in vineyards and fields, and it was coined from the verb puditi (also spelled pudati) meaning to chase or scare away. The meaning of the Hungarian loanword was expanded to guards in general, including law enforcement officers. The word was likely ultimately derived from medieval Latin banderius or bannerius, meaning either a guardian of fields or summoner, or follower of a banner.
 Another etymology could recall the ancient greek expression "pan" with "ther", which is "great" or "all-beast", already used in ancient times (see the latin word "Panther", often used to refer to occupying troop soldiers of Roman Empire and root of the German word "Panzer" itself). 
By the middle of the 18th century, law enforcement in the counties of Croatia included county pandurs or hussars who patrolled roads and pursued criminals. In 1740, the term was applied to frontier guard duty infantry deployed in the Croatian Military Frontier (Banal Frontier), specifically its Karlovac and Varaždin Generalcies. The role of the pandurs as security guards was extended to Dalmatia after the establishment of Austrian rule there in the early 19th century. The term has dropped from official use for law enforcement officials, but it is still used colloquially in Croatia and the Western Balkans in a manner akin to the English word cop. The unit raised and led by Trenck is also referred to more specifically as Trenck's Pandurs, and less frequently in Croatia than elsewhere, as Croatian Pandurs.

History
The Pandurs were a skirmisher unit of the Habsburg monarchy, raised by Baron Franz von der Trenck following a charter issued by Maria Theresa of Austria on 27 February 1741, permitting Trenck to raise a 1,000-strong troop. The unit was largely composed of men enlisted as volunteers from areas of the Kingdom of Slavonia and Slavonian Military Frontier, consisting of ethnic Croats and Serbs. The Pandurs saw military action in Silesia, Bohemia, Bavaria and France.

The Pandurs arrived in Vienna for a military parade for the empress on 27 May 1741. The unit was headed by Trenck and included two captains, a senior lieutenant, five lieutenants, a quartermaster, an adjutant, two chaplains (a Catholic and an Orthodox Christian), two medics, 40 sergeants, five scribes, 80 corporals and twelve musicians equipped with flutes, a drum and cymbals. The musicians were called the Turkish band, after Ottoman military bands, and are considered pioneers of martial music in Europe according to Jurica Miletić. The Pandurs did not have specific uniforms—their clothes varied but were of Turkish style. Their oriental appearance was compounded by mandatory head shaving, leaving a rattail, as well as by the use of a horse tail bunchuk instead of a unit banner. Each Pandur carried four single-shot pistols, a fighting knife and a small knife.

The Pandurs took part in War of the Austrian Succession, including the First Silesian War. They took part in capturing Zobten am Berge and Strehlen in Lower Silesia from the Prussians, and defending a bridgehead near Vienna after the Battle of Mollwitz. In 1742, the Pandurs took part in capture of Klaus Castle in Styria as well as Linz and Deggendorf, where they defeated French troops before taking part in Austrian recapture of Munich. By the end of that year, the Pandurs had captured Diessenstein Castle and Cham from Bavarian defenders, completely destroying Cham to secure access for Habsburg troops led by Ludwig Andreas von Khevenhüller to Bohemia. In 1743, the Pandurs led by Trenck captured Cosel fortress. In 1745, during the Second Silesian War, the Pandurs took part in the Battle of Soor, where they looted a Prussian war chest containing 80,000 ducats, as well as weapons, horses and a tent belonging to Frederick the Great.

The Pandurs earned a reputation for being brave and audacious, as well as feared and ruthless soldiers, looting and pillaging, but also characterized by disobedience, breaches of military discipline and stubbornness.  On the other hand, the City of Waldmünchen, located near Cham, celebrates the Pandurs and Trenck as their savior for sparing the city from destruction in 1742. Since 1950, the city organizes a historical reenactment of the event involving about 300 actors.

The original organization of the unit was retained until 1745, when it was transformed into a Pandur regiment following Trenck's petition to the empress. Trenck was relieved of command in 1746 and tried for unspecified "acts of violence". He was imprisoned in Spielberg Castle, where he died in 1749. After the Peace of Aachen, the regiment was transformed into a Slavonian battalion on 22 December 1748. In 1756, as the Seven Years' War started, the battalion was reformed into the 53rd Infantry Regiment and its headquarters moved to Zagreb ending history of the Pandurs. Still, the regiment kept its Pandur lineage alive through its commemorative medals bearing Trenck's image wearing Pandur attire. The regiment was disbanded in January 1919.

Legacy

The achievements of the Pandurs led by Trenck left a lasting mark on the culture and heritage of Croatia as well as Bavaria. An example of the unit's legacy is found in the village of Trenkovo—named after the commander of the Pandurs in 1912. The village is located in area of Trenck's former Velika estate, near Požega, Croatia, where the baron lived. It was the location of a baroque manor once owned by Trenck, which was replaced by another structure in the late 18th or early 19th centuries. Pandur heritage is preserved by the Trenck's Pandurs military band—the official music band of the city of Požega—established on 28 January 1881. In 1997, an eponymous living history troop was established out of members of the band. Also, a Trenck festival is held annually in Waldmünchen, commemorating the events of 1742, when the city was spared by Trenck from destruction.

The military unit and its leader also give their names to a modern armed force unit and modern military equipment. Special police platoon Trenk, formed in Požega on 8 March 1991, took part in the Croatian War of Independence. Steyr-Daimler-Puch produces the Pandur armoured fighting vehicle.

See also
 Tudor Vladimirescu—commanded a pandur militia in the Wallachian uprising of 1821
 Seressaner

References

War of the Austrian Succession
Croatia under Habsburg rule
Military Frontier
Military history of Croatia
Military history of Serbia
Military units and formations established in 1741
Habsburg Croats
Habsburg Serbs
1741 establishments in the Habsburg monarchy
Army of the Habsburg monarchy
18th-century military history of Croatia
Irregular military